The Juneteenth flag is a symbol for the Juneteenth holiday in the United States. The first version was created in 1997 by activist Ben Haith and that early version was displayed in 1997. The present version was first flown in 2000. The colors and symbols on the flag are representative of freedom and the end of slavery. The date on the flag represents that of General Order No. 3 issued in Galveston, Texas in 1865. In 2020 and 2021, many states began recognizing Juneteenth by flying the flag over their state capitol buildings, especially after Juneteenth was declared a federal holiday by President Joe Biden in June 2021.

Design
The Juneteenth flag was designed in 1997 by activist Boston Ben (Ben Haith). Haith displayed the first version of the Juneteenth flag in June 1997 at Boston's John Eliot Square District. It was described by Patricia Smith of the Boston Globe as, "A banner adorned with sunbursts and flaming candles". The present design was completed and copyrighted by Haith in 2000. Haith is also the founder of the National Juneteenth Celebration. Lisa Jeanne Graf claims on her website that she was another contributor to the design: she states that she fine-tuned the design of the flag for the National Juneteenth Celebration Foundation.

The flag uses the colors of red, white and blue from the American flag. Featured prominently in the center of the flag is a bursting star. Running through the center of the flag horizontally, is an arc that is meant to symbolize the new horizon of opportunity for black people. According to the president of the National Juneteenth Observance Foundation Steve Williams, the star is a "Bursting star of freedom." Williams also states that the arch representing the horizon shows blue above and the red color below is symbolic of the ground soaked with blood; the blood which was shed by the African American slaves for the United States. The red, white, and blue colors were meant to convey the message that all enslaved people and their descendants are American. In 2007, the date "June 19, 1865" was added.

Symbolism

The five-pointed star refers both to Texas (nicknamed the "Lone Star state") and to the "freedom of African Americans in all 50 states". Surrounding it is a  nova (or "new star") representing a new beginning for all.

Lincoln's Emancipation Proclamation of June 1, 1863, declared that all slaves in the rebel Confederate States were free. The State of Texas rejoined the Union with the end of the Civil War on April 9, 1865. On June 19, 1865, Union General Gordon Granger arrived at the port of Galveston Texas and announced that slavery had been ended with General Order No. 3. The Juneteenth Flag has the date of June 19, 1865 displayed on it.

One year later freed slaves in Texas celebrated the first Juneteenth on June 19, and it was called "Jubilee Day".

History
The most recognizable symbol of Juneteenth is the Juneteenth flag. The flag was first flown in 2000, at Boston's Roxbury Heritage State Park. Ben Haith initiated the Boston flag raising. Beginning in 2020 in the United States, several state governors ordered the Juneteenth flag to be raised over their capital buildings on June 19. In 2020, Wisconsin Governor Tony Evers ordered the flag to be flown for the month of June. When the flag was raised in Wisconsin, state senator Lena Taylor of Milwaukee and the Wisconsin Legislative Black Caucus celebrated by raising their fists. Also in 2020 the flag was raised over the Cincinnati City Hall. In Illinois, Governor Pritzker ordered the flag to be flown above the Illinois State Capitol on June 19, 2021. In 2021 President Joe Biden signed a law marking Juneteenth as a federal holiday.

In 2020 the Boston Red Sox raised the Juneteenth flag over Fenway Park. The  University of Nebraska celebrated Juneteenth by flying the flag alongside their Nebraska flag in 2020.

The Pan-African flag and Juneteenth
Many in the African American community have adopted the Pan-African flag to represent Juneteenth. The Pan-African flag is sometimes referred to as the black liberation flag and so it is often displayed in conjunction or in place of the Juneteenth flag. The Pan-African flag has been in use since 1920. The difference between the two flags is that the Juneteenth flag was created for a single holiday, and the Pan African flag is representative of African displacement.

See also

Black Nationalism
Ethnic flag

References

External links

Video - Juneteenth is now a federal holiday. Here is the meaning behind the flag

Juneteenth
Flags of the United States